DG2 can refer to

 Discrete Graphics 2, a graphics card made by Intel, later renamed to Intel Arc Alchemist
 The 2014 video game Defense Grid 2.